"Head" is a song by the English singer-songwriter Julian Cope. It is the third and final single released in support of his album Peggy Suicide.

Chart positions

References

1991 singles
Julian Cope songs
1990 songs
Island Records singles
Songs written by Julian Cope